Conistone is a small village in the Craven district of North Yorkshire, England. The area dialing code is 01756 and postal town is Skipton.

History
Conistone is mentioned in the Domesday Book as Cunestune and belonging to Ketil. The name derives from a mix of Old Danish (Kunung) and Old English (tūn), which means King's farm or Settlement.

The village is set in characteristic limestone scenery, including Mossdale Caverns, the dry gorge of Conistone Dib and the limestone outcrop of Conistone Pie.  Above the Dib the Dales Way path connects Kettlewell, to its north, and Grassington, to its south, providing distant views over Wharfedale. From the B6160 road, the Wharfe is crossed at Conistone by a stone-arch bridge, which is within easy walking distance of Kilnsey, with its Crag.

The parish church, St Mary's Church, dates from the 11th or 12th century, and is a Grade II listed building.

Conistone was historically in the large ancient parish of Burnsall, in Staincliffe Wapentake in the West Riding of Yorkshire.  It became part of the civil parish of Conistone with Kilnsey in 1866, and was transferred to North Yorkshire in 1974. The population of the parish in the 2001 census was 117, rising to 124 at the 2011 census. In 2015, North Yorkshire County Council had estimated the population to be 110.

Immediately to the east of the village lies Conistone Moor and Riggs Moor. The moorland here was known for its lead mines, and also as being the furthest point in England from a road.

Gallery

References

External links

Villages in North Yorkshire
Wharfedale